The Uruguayan Championship 1929 was the 27th season of Uruguay's top-flight football league.

Overview
The tournament consisted of a two-wheel championship of all against all. It involved fourteen teams, and the champion was Peñarol.

Teams

League standings

References

Uruguay – List of final tables (RSSSF)

Uruguayan Primera División seasons
Uru
1929 in Uruguayan football